Bucculatrix koebelella is a species of moth in the family Bucculatricidae. It is found in North America, where it has been recorded from California. It was described in 1910 by August Busck.

Adults have been recorded on wing from February to April, in June and in September, probably in two generations per year.

References

Natural History Museum Lepidoptera generic names catalog

Bucculatricidae
Moths described in 1910
Moths of North America